Timothy Naftali is a Canadian-American historian who is clinical associate professor of public service at New York University. He has written four books, two of them co-authored with Alexander Fursenko on the Cuban Missile Crisis and Nikita Khrushchev. He is a regular CNN contributor as a CNN presidential historian.

Early life and education 
Naftali was born in Montreal and at one point worked as an aide to Robert Bourassa. In 2007, he told the Toronto Star that he left Canada for the US in response to Quebec's language laws: "It seemed to me that the deck was stacked against civil liberties and I preferred to be in a country where I didn't have to worry about what language I spoke." He earned his undergraduate degree from Yale, and later obtained graduate degrees from Johns Hopkins and Harvard.

Career 
Naftali's area of focus was the history of counterterrorism and the Cold War. Before taking the Nixon Library position, Naftali had been an associate professor at the University of Virginia, where he directed the Miller Center of Public Affairs' Presidential Recordings Program. In the 1990s, he taught at the University of Hawaii and Yale University.

He served as a consultant to the 9/11 Commission, which commissioned him to write an unclassified history of American counterterrorism policy. This was later expanded into his well-received 2005 book Blind Spot: The Secret History of American Counterterrorism.

From 2007 to 2011, he directed the Richard Nixon Presidential Library and Museum. He was appointed when control of the Library was transferred from the Richard Nixon Foundation to the National Archives and Records Administration.  His biggest task at the library was to present a more objective and unbiased picture of the Watergate scandal—a task completed in March 2011, when the Library's new Watergate gallery opened and received extensive news coverage.  Naftali left the Nixon Library later that year.

Personal life 
Naftali is gay. He has said that he has faced discrimination for his sexual orientation in the past.

Selected publications
1997: One Hell of a Gamble: Khrushchev, Castro, and Kennedy, 1958–1964 (with Aleksandr Fursenko): 
2001: John F. Kennedy: The Great Crises (edited with Philip D. Zelikow and Ernest R. May): 
2005: Blind Spot: The Secret History of American Counterterrorism: 
2006: Khrushchev's Cold War: The Inside Story of an American Adversary (with Aleksandr Fursenko), which won the Duke of Westminster's Medal for Military Literature: 
2007: George H. W. Bush: 
2018: Impeachment: An American History

References

External links
Los Angeles Times interview  
Articles by Naftali at Slate
Blog posts by Naftali at The Huffington Post

1962 births
Living people
Academics from Montreal
Johns Hopkins University alumni
Harvard University alumni
Yale University alumni
Cold War historians
Writers from Montreal
LGBT historians
20th-century Canadian historians
Canadian male non-fiction writers
Canadian gay writers
Gay academics
21st-century Canadian historians
21st-century Canadian LGBT people
20th-century Canadian LGBT people
Canadian LGBT academics